Pharbelus or Pharbelos was a town of the Chalcidice in ancient Macedonia. It belonged to the Delian League since it appears in the tribute records of Athens between 454/3 and 433/2 BCE, as well as in a tributary decree of 422/1 BCE. It is probable that it was one of the cities that rebelled against Athens in the year 432 BCE. Pharbelus is mentioned by Stephanus of Byzantium, who says it was a city of Eretria; this has been interpreted as either that Pharbelus was an Eretrian colony or there was an otherwise unknown town of that name in Euboea.

Its site is unlocated.

References

Populated places in ancient Macedonia
Former populated places in Greece
Members of the Delian League
Lost ancient cities and towns
Eretrian colonies
Greek colonies in Chalcidice